Spathopygus eburioides is a species of beetle in the family Cerambycidae, the only species in the genus Spathopygus.

References

Torneutini
Monotypic beetle genera